Industrial region or industrial area refers to a geographical region with extremely dense industry. It is usually heavily urbanized.

Brazil
ABCD Region, sometimes called ABC (ABC paulista or Região do Grande ABC in Portuguese) is an industrial region made up of seven municipalities with the greater metropolitan area of São Paulo, Brazil.

Bulgaria
Industrial region Thracia is an industrial zone made up of several municipalities within the area of Plovdiv, Bulgaria.

Japan
Chūkyō Industrial Area
Hanshin Industrial Region
Kanto region

Korea
Kaesŏng Industrial Region, North Korea
Southeastern Maritime Industrial Region, South Korea

Poland
Białystok Industrial Region
Bielsko Industrial Region
Bydgoszcz-Toruń Industrial Region
Carpathian Industrial Region
Central Industrial Region
Częstochowa Industrial Region
Gdańsk Industrial Region
Upper Silesian Industrial Region 
Jaworzno-Chrzanów Industrial Region
Kalisz-Ostrów Industrial Region
Kraków Industrial Region
Legnica-Głogów Copper Area
Lublin Industrial Region
Łódź Industrial Region
Olsztyn Industrial Region
Opole Industrial Region
Piotrków-Bełchatów Industrial Region
Poznań Industrial Region
Rybnik Coal Area
Old-Polish Industrial Region
Sudeten Industrial Region
Szczecin Industrial Region
Tarnobrzeg Industrial Region
Tarnów-Rzeszów Industrial Region
Warsaw Industrial Region
Wrocław Industrial Region
Zielona Góra-Żary Industrial Region

Russia 
 Kuzbass

Saudi Arabia
Jubail Industrial City.
Yanbu Industrial City.

Industrial Valley at King Abdullah Economic City, is part of a fully integrated city on the Red Sea covering an area of 181 million square metres. KAEC's components are King Abdullah Port, Industrial Valley and Coastal Communities.

Ukraine 
 Donbas
 Kryvbas

See also
Industrial park
Metropolitan area

regions
regions
Lists by region